The Mercedes-Benz OM629 is a  diesel-fuelled, 4-stroke, compression-ignition internal combustion 75° 32-valve V8 engine used in the 2000s. It is the world’s first aluminium V8 diesel engine.



Design 
The block features an aluminium crankcase and cylinder heads. It uses aluminium sand casting in bedplate construction (divided at the height of the crankshaft) with wet cylinder liners made of cast iron. 

The main bearings are reinforced, cast in GGG ductile cast iron. Rather than the usual 90° "vee" angle between the cylinder banks, a 75° angle was chosen due to the space available to install the engine. The consequence of this specific angle is free inertial forces of the first order. To compensate for this, the OM628 and OM629 use a balancer shaft located in the vee of the engine. To ensure even firing intervals the crankshaft uses split crank pins. The engine uses 97.0 mm cylinder spacing.

The engine uses dual overhead camshafts on each bank (‘quad-cam’) with four valves per cylinder, operated by hydraulic tappets. Each cylinder bank uses a variable geometry turbocharger. The compressed air from these is cooled by an air to water heat exchanger with an additional cold water circuit.

Compared to the OM628, the OM629 engine has an improved common-rail system, and higher boost from the turbochargers.

Models

OM629 (225 kW version) 
 2006–2009 X164 GL420 CDI
 2007–2009 W164 ML420 CDI
 2009–2010 X164 GL450 CDI
 2009–2010 W164 ML450 CDI

OM629 (231 kW version) 
 2005–2009 W211 E420 CDI

OM629 (235 kW version) 
 2006–2009 W221 S420 CDI
 2009–2010 W221 S450 CDI

References 

OM629
Diesel engines by model
V8 engines